Kannon Kumar Shanmugam (born November 15, 1972) is an American lawyer known for his litigation at the U.S. Supreme Court.  He has been a partner at the law firm of Paul, Weiss, Rifkind, Wharton & Garrison since 2019, and is the managing partner of the firm's Washington office and chair of its Supreme Court and appellate practice group. Shanmugam has been mentioned as a possible Solicitor General or judicial nominee in a Republican administration. 

Shanmugam joined Paul, Weiss in a highly publicized move from Williams & Connolly, where he was head of the firm's Supreme Court and appellate practice. He previously served as an Assistant to the Solicitor General of the United States. Before joining the Solicitor General's office, he was an associate at the law firm of Kirkland & Ellis.

Early life and education 
Shanmugam was born on November 15, 1972, in Lawrence, Kansas. Both his parents had immigrated to the United States from India in the late 1960s. His father, Kumarasamy "Sam" Shanmugam, was a professor of electrical engineering at the University of Kansas for over 30 years.

Shanmugam attended Lawrence High School and graduated as co-valedictorian in 1989 at age 16. He then went to Harvard University, where he was editor-in-chief of The Harvard Independent. He graduated in 1993 with an A.B. summa cum laude in Classics. 

In 1993, Shanmugam won a Marshall Scholarship and spent the next two years in England doing graduate study in Classics at Keble College, Oxford. He received a Master of Letters degree in 1995.  Shanmugam then returned to the United States to attend Harvard Law School, where he was an executive editor of the Harvard Law Review and argued the case for the winning side in the Ames Moot Court Competition. He graduated in 1998 with a Juris Doctor magna cum laude.

Career
After law school, Shanmugam was a law clerk for judge J. Michael Luttig of the U.S. Court of Appeals for the Fourth Circuit from 1998 to 1999, then for justice Antonin Scalia of the U.S. Supreme Court from 1999 to 2000. 

Shanmugam then entered private practice as an associate at  the law firm of Kirkland & Ellis, where he worked for noted lawyer and judge Kenneth Starr. In 2004, Shanmugam became an assistant to the U.S. Solicitor General, where he worked for four years and argued eight cases before the Supreme Court. In 2008, he joined the law firm of Williams & Connolly, where he built the firm's Supreme Court and appellate practice. He was the only lawyer to have joined the firm as a lateral partner in 32 years. In 2019, Shanmugam moved to the law firm of Paul, Weiss, Rifkind, Wharton & Garrison to become the managing partner of the firm's Washington, D.C. office and chair of its newly established Supreme Court and appellate practice.

Shanmugam has served as co-chair of the American Bar Association's Appellate Practice Committee and is also a past president of the Edward Coke Appellate Inn of Court. He is the only practicing American attorney who is an honorary bencher of the Inner Temple, one of the four English Inns of Court. He taught a course on Supreme Court advocacy as an adjunct professor of law at the Georgetown University Law Center, and served on the board of trustees of Thurgood Marshall Academy. He is a longtime member of the Federalist Society.

Shanmugam has argued 35 cases before the Supreme Court. Most notably, in 2020, he argued on behalf of Seila Law LLC in the landmark case Seila Law LLC v. Consumer Financial Protection Bureau.  In 2018, he argued on behalf of the victims of the USS Cole bombing and their families in Republic of Sudan v. Harrison.

See also 
 List of law clerks of the Supreme Court of the United States (Seat 9)

References

External links 
 Appearances at the U.S. Supreme Court from the Oyez Project
 Paul, Weiss bio
 

1972 births
Living people
20th-century American lawyers
21st-century American lawyers
Alumni of the University of Oxford
Federalist Society members
Georgetown University Law Center faculty
Harvard College alumni
Harvard Law School alumni
Kansas Republicans
People associated with Kirkland & Ellis
Law clerks of the Supreme Court of the United States
Marshall Scholars
People from Lawrence, Kansas
Law clerks of J. Michael Luttig
Williams & Connolly people
Paul, Weiss, Rifkind, Wharton & Garrison people